Several moth species are known as skeletonizers, including:

Aglaope infausta (almond-tree leaf skeletonizer moth)
Bucculatrix ainsliella (oak leaf skeletonizer, oak skeletonizer)
Bucculatrix albertiella (oak-ribber skeletonizer)
Bucculatrix canadensisella (birch skeletonizer)
Catastega aceriella (maple trumpet skeletonizer moth)
Choreutis nemorana (fig-tree skeletonizer moth, fig leaf roller)
Choreutis pariana (apple-and-thorn skeletonizer, apple leaf skeletonizer)
Harrisina americana (grapeleaf skeletonizer)
Harrisina metallica (western grapeleaf skeletonizer)
Prochoreutis inflatella (skullcap skeletonizer moth)
Schreckensteinia festaliella (blackberry skeletonizer)

See also
Skeletonization (disambiguation)

Animal common name disambiguation pages